Committee of Selection may refer to:

 Committee of Selection (House of Commons), a select committee in the Parliament of the United Kingdom
 Committee of Selection (House of Lords), a committee in the Parliament of the United Kingdom
 Committee of Selection (Malaysian House of Representatives), a committee in the Parliament of Malaysia
 Committee of Selection (Malaysian Senate), a committee in the Parliament of Malaysia

See also 

 Selection Committee